Ruzizi III Hydroelectric Power Station is a proposed hydropower plant with planned capacity installation of 206 MW when completed.

Location
The power station is located on Ruzizi River, straddling the common border between Rwanda and the Democratic Republic of the Congo (DC). The approximate coordinates of Ruzizi III Power Station are:

Overview
This power station is the third in a cascade of power stations on the Ruzizi River, benefiting the countries of Burundi, DRC and Rwanda. The power stations include Ruzizi I (29.8 megawatts) and Ruzizi II (43.8 megawatts), both located northwest of Ruzizi III and both operational as of June 2017. The power generated will be distributed to the three countries via existing distribution networks, connected to Ruzizi I and Ruzizi II. Both power stations and the transmission networks will be rehabilitated. Rwanda is expected to absorb 68 megawatts of the 206 megawatts generated at Ruzizi III.

Funding
As of December 2015, the cost of construction was calculated at US$625.19 million. Of this, "US$138.88 million will be borne by the AfDB’s public sector window and US$50.22 million by the private sector window". Other funders include the European Investment Bank, KfW and the World Bank. More recent reports have put the cost at $450 million. Financial closure is expected to be achieved by mid-2021.

Ownership
In August 2019, it was reported that the three African governments concerned had jointly selected Scatec (formerly SN Power) and Industrial Promotion Services (IPS) to execute this renewable energy infrastructure project. The consortium formed a joint venture company, called   Ruzizi III Energy Limited (REL). The table below illustrates the ownership of the power station.

When commissioned, the power generated here is expected to cost between US$0.11 and US$0.13 per kilo Watthour of energy. An estimated 30 million people will benefit.

See also

References

External links
 Official Website of Ruzizi III Energy Limited
 World Bank Announces US$1 Billion Pledge to Africa’s Great Lakes Region

Hydroelectric power stations in Rwanda
Proposed hydroelectric power stations
Western Province, Rwanda
Rusizi District
Proposed renewable energy power stations in Rwanda